James F. Entwistle (born 1956) was the United States Ambassador to Nigeria from October 28, 2013 to October 2016. From 2010 until 2013 he was the ambassador to the Democratic Republic of the Congo. He is a career Foreign Service Officer. He was Deputy Chief of Mission at the U.S. Embassy in Bangkok, Thailand from July 2007 and was Deputy Chief of Mission at the U.S. Embassy in Colombo, Sri Lanka from 2004 until 2006 ("with simultaneous accreditation to Maldives").

Biography

Entwistle graduated from Davidson College in North Carolina. He joined the Foreign Service in 1981 and worked in Yaounde, Douala and Niamey from 1981 until 1986. He was a watch officer in the Bureau of Intelligence and Research and the desk officer for Kenya and Uganda in the Bureau of African Affairs from 1986 until 1990 and headed the Refugee Assistance Unit at Embassy Bangkok  from 1991 until 1994. He was Deputy Chief of Mission in Bangui from 1994 until 1995 and was in the Bureau of Consular Affairs until his assignment as Counselor for Political Affairs at the U.S. Embassy in Kuala Lumpur, Malaysia from 1999 until 2003.

He was Deputy Chief of Mission at the U.S. Embassy in Bangkok, Thailand from July 2007 and was Deputy Chief of Mission at the U.S. Embassy in Colombo, Sri Lanka from 2004 until 2006 ("with simultaneous accreditation to Maldives").

From 2010 until 2013 he was the ambassador to the Democratic Republic of the Congo. He is the U.S. ambassador to Benin Republic as of October 28, 2013.

Personal life
He speaks French, Thai and some pidgin. He is married to Pamela G. Schmoll and has two children.

See also
Ambassadors of the United States

References

External links

|-

1956 births
Living people
Ambassadors of the United States to the Democratic Republic of the Congo
Ambassadors of the United States to Nigeria
Davidson College alumni
United States Foreign Service personnel